Brian Hill (born 29 April 1947)) is an English former football referee in the English Football League, Premier League and at FIFA level. For most of his career, he was based in Northamptonshire, initially Wellingborough, then Kettering, finally moving to the Leicestershire town of Market Harborough. Outside football he worked as an accountant.

Career
He became a Football League linesman in 1975 and two years later joined the Supplementary List of referees, in its last year of operation. He successfully progressed to the full Referees List for the following season at the age of thirty one.

He established himself over the next few years with frequent matches at the top level. In 1985, he was elevated to the FIFA Panel while still in his late thirties. The following season saw his most prominent match to date as Everton defeated Sheffield Wednesday in an FA Cup semi-final.

In 1988 came his greatest honour as he took charge of the FA Cup Final between Wimbledon and Liverpool. Liverpool were expected to win easily and achieve the double but instead 7th place Wimbledon pulled off an upset in a memorable Final. He disallowed a Peter Beardsley goal giving Liverpool a freekick instead. They won 1-0 and Dave Beasant saved a John Aldridge penalty that would have brought Liverpool back to parity. This was the first time that a penalty had not been converted in an FA Cup Final at Wembley.

Over the next few seasons Hill refereed many matches in the top division. He was chosen for the new Premier League and indeed handled a match on its very first day as Sheffield United beat Manchester United (the eventual champions) 2–1. However, this season was not without its problems. He did not receive any appointments in the Premier League in the opening months of the 1993–94 campaign - unusual for such an experienced official, who was still on the FIFA List.

He served at international level until the end of 1994. FIFA had reduced its retirement age to forty five but there was a period of grace before the 1994 World Cup, in which older officials could be retained, and the FA gave him one extra year.

His departure from the FIFA List coincided with a resurgence in his domestic career. On 3 January 1994 he took charge of the Coventry City versus Swindon Town Premier League match, and thereafter was a regular again at this level. On 19 March he handled Swindon again, this time in a home draw with champions Manchester United which saw Eric Cantona sent off. In 1994–95 the Premier List was reduced considerably, but he retained his place, and all his subsequent League games were in the Premier League.

In 1995 the Leagues decided to end the practice of granting age extensions to those reaching forty-eight, and he therefore ended his career at the standard age. His last match was the 3–3 draw between Everton and Chelsea at Goodison Park on 3 May 1995.

References

Print
Football League Handbooks, 1975–1977
Rothmans Football Yearbooks, 1978-1995 (†1988 edition, p29)
Gilbert Upton (2005) Football League and Premiership Referees 1888 to 2005, Soccerdata

Internet

External links
 Brian Hill Referee Statistics at soccerbase.com (1992-93 only)

1947 births
English football referees
FA Cup Final referees
People from Market Harborough
Sportspeople from Leicestershire
People from Wellingborough
Living people
English Football League referees
Premier League referees